"Back in My Arms Again" is a 1965 song recorded by The Supremes for the Motown label.

Written and produced by Motown's main production team Holland–Dozier–Holland, "Back in My Arms Again" was the fifth consecutive and overall number-one song for the group on the Billboard Hot 100 pop singles chart in the United States from June 6, 1965 through June 12, 1965, also topping the soul chart for a week.

History
Eddie Holland of the Holland–Dozier–Holland wrote the basis sketch for "Back in My Arms Again."

"Back in My Arms Again" was the last of five Supremes songs in a row to go number one (the others are "Where Did Our Love Go", "Baby Love", "Come See About Me", and "Stop! In the Name of Love"). The song's middle eight is almost identical to a later Holland-Dozier-Holland hit, The Isley Brothers "This Old Heart of Mine (Is Weak for You)".

On the album in which this single appeared, More Hits by the Supremes, and on the official single, each member is pictured separately on the front cover, with her signature above it.

The Supremes performed the song on The Mike Douglas Show, a syndicated daytime program, on May 5, 1965 and again on November 3. They performed the song nationally on the NBC variety program Hullabaloo! on Tuesday, May 11, 1965, peaking on the music charts in the following weeks.

Billboard said that "Back in My Arms Again" has "a strong teen lyric and a powerful vocal performance pitted against a hard rock backing in full support."  Cash Box described it as "a rollicking, pop-r&b romancer about a lucky lass who gets back with her boyfriend after quite a hiatus."  Allmusic critic Ed Hogan called the rhythm section provided by the Funk Brothers "tight," the saxophone played by Mike Terry "rollicking" and the vibraphone played by James Gitten "dreamy."

Personnel
 Lead vocals by Diana Ross
 Background vocals by Florence Ballard and Mary Wilson
 All instruments by the Funk Brothers
Earl Van Dyke – piano
Joe Messina – guitar
James Jamerson – bass
Benny Benjamin – drums
James Gittens – vibraphone
Mike Terry – baritone saxophone

Charts

Weekly charts

Year-end charts

Certifications

Later versions
"Back in My Arms Again" returned to the Billboard Hot 100 in 1978 with a remake by Genya Ravan on a single (taken from the singer's album Urban Desire) which was Ravan's only Hot 100 entry, peaking at #92.

The song almost made the Hot 100 in 1983 via a remake on Motown's Gordy label by female vocal group High Inergy, whose 1977 debut album Turnin' On had yielded a Top 20 hit in ("You Can't Turn Me Off") and elicited numerous comparisons with the Supremes. High Inergy remained a one hit wonder despite the release of seven more albums and 27 more singles. In 1983, the group released what would be their last album, Groove Patrol, from which a near note-for-note remake of "Back in My Arms Again" was released as a  single (the group's last) and reached #105 on the Billboard Bubbling Under Hot 100 chart  (without ranking on the magazine's R&B chart).

"Back in My Arms Again" has also been remade by the Michael Stanley Band (on Greatest Hints, 1979),Nicolette Larson (as "Back in My Arms" on In the Nick of Time in 1980), by Michael Bolton (on his eponymous 1983 album), by The Forester Sisters (on Perfume, Ribbons & Pearls in 1986), and by Colin James (on the American Boyfriends soundtrack album in 1989).

The song was recorded by the all-female American rock group Fanny in early 1973 but their version, produced by Todd Rundgren, remained unreleased until 2002, when it appeared on Rhino Handmade's limited-edition  Fanny anthology First Time In A Long Time: The Reprise Recordings. The outtake was later included on the 2016 reissue of 1973's Mothers Pride. The song was also covered by The Jam live at the 100 Club on 11 September 1977, a version released on the six-CD set Fire and Skill – The Jam Live in 2015.

See also
 List of Hot 100 number-one singles of 1965 (U.S.)

References

External links
 

The Supremes songs
1965 songs
1965 singles
Billboard Hot 100 number-one singles
Cashbox number-one singles
RPM Top Singles number-one singles
Songs written by Holland–Dozier–Holland
Song recordings produced by Brian Holland
Song recordings produced by Lamont Dozier
Motown singles